Never Leave Me is a 2017 Bosnian drama film directed by Aida Begić. It was selected as the Bosnian entry for the Best Foreign Language Film at the 91st Academy Awards, but it was not nominated.

Cast
 Ismail Hakki as Jury
 Carol Abboud as Doaa
 Motaz Faez Basha as Motaz
 Isa Demlakhi as Isa
 Feyyaz Duman as Adil
 Nisreen Faour as Hiba

See also
 List of submissions to the 91st Academy Awards for Best Foreign Language Film
 List of Bosnian submissions for the Academy Award for Best Foreign Language Film

References

External links
 

2017 films
2017 drama films
2010s Arabic-language films
2010s Turkish-language films
Bosnia and Herzegovina drama films
2017 multilingual films